Goh Chok Tong  (born 20 May 1941) is a Singaporean former politician who served as Prime Minister of Singapore between 1990 and 2004, and Secretary-General of the People's Action Party between 1992 and 2004. He was the Member of Parliament (MP) for Marine Parade SMC between 1976 and 1988, and Marine Parade GRC between 1988 and 2020.

Prior to his appointment as prime minister, he was the country's deputy prime minister, where he advocated for the Medisave, a scheme that allows Singaporeans to set aside part of their income into a Medisave account to meet future medical expenses. Goh also advocated for the Edusave Awards, a monetary reward for students who did well in school based on either their academic or character, to enshrine meritocracy. 

During his tenure as prime minister, political reforms like the introduction of Non-Constituency Members of Parliament (NCMP), to allow more oppositions into Parliament, Group Representation Constituency (GRC), to make sure that the minorities are represented in Parliament and Nominated Member of Parliament (NMP), to have independent opinions in Parliament since all NMPs are non-partisan, were also proposed by Goh when he was serving as Deputy Prime Minister after assuming the responsibility of the government in a carefully managed leadership transition.

Goh's tenure as prime minister was also marked by the 1991 aircraft hijack of SQ117, 1997 Asian financial crisis, 2001 embassies attack plot and the 2003 SARS outbreak. His government enacted the Elected President scheme in 1991 as presidents before were appointed by Parliament. His government also introduced the Vehicle Quota Scheme to limit the number of vehicles in the city-state.

He was succeeded by Lee Hsien Loong, the eldest son of Singapore's first prime minister, Lee Kuan Yew, on 12 August 2004 and was subsequently appointed as a senior minister in the Cabinet and chairman of the Monetary Authority of Singapore (MAS) between 2004 and 2011. 

He resigned from the Cabinet in 2011 before stepping down as a Member of Parliament (MP) and retire from politics in 2020. He was given the honorary title Emeritus Senior Minister in 2011 by Prime Minister Lee Hsien Loong. He is also the only living former prime minister.

Early life and education
Goh was born in Singapore on 20 May 1941 to Goh Kah Choon and Quah Kwee Hwa, who hailed from the Minnan region of Fujian province in China. He has Chinese Hokkien ancestry. Goh studied at Raffles Institution from 1955 to 1960. He was a very competitive swimmer in his younger days and was given the nickname "Bold".

Goh completed a Bachelor of Arts with first class honours degree in economics at the University of Singapore, and a Master of Arts degree in development economics at Williams College in 1967. 

Upon his graduation, Goh returned to Singapore to work in the government. Goh's dream of getting a PhD was disrupted as the government would not transfer his bursary bond to the university, where he had signed on as a research fellow after graduation. 

In 2015, Goh was awarded an honorary Doctor of Laws degree by his alma mater, the National University of Singapore, for his contributions to the country.

Career 
In 1969, Goh was seconded to the national shipping company Neptune Orient Lines (NOL) as the company's Planning and Projects Manager. His career advanced quickly and by 1973 he was the Managing Director. At NOL, Goh worked under the company's founder, Muhammad Jalaluddin Sayeed, with whom he maintained close ties.

Political career
In the 1976 general election, Goh, then 35, was elected as Member of Parliament for Marine Parade SMC as a People's Action Party (PAP) candidate. He was appointed as a Senior Minister of State. In 1981, he was promoted to Minister for Trade and Industry and later served in other appointments including Minister for Health and Minister for Defence.

Goh was tasked to organise the 1981 Anson SMC by-election which was a pivotal event in shaping his political sensibilities. Despite having been passed as first assistant secretary-general by Tony Tan, Goh was surprisedly asked by Lee Kuan Yew to lead and organise the by-election, which was ostensibly because of Goh previous successful campaigns in organising the 1979 by-election at Anson SMC and the 1980 General Elections. Early on in the campaigning for the 1981 Anson SMC by-election, a chasm of leadership emerged as volunteers and older activists for the previous MP Devan Nair departed along with the MP.  The new PAP candidate was Pang Kim Hin, who has difficulties connecting to the ground as he had a reputation of being a "rich man's son", being the nephew of Old Guard minister Lim Kan San. Despite being a three-cornered fight, it was apparent that the main opposition candidate was J. B. Jeyaretnam, who was a veteran opposition at the time, having previously came close in winning the seat at Telok Blangah, which is of close proximity to Anson. The rising costs of housing and upcoming public bus fares was a source of unhappiness among voters. PAP lost the Anson seat with a 37-point swing in just 10 months since the last General Election, marking the first time since Independence that PAP has lost a seat. This watershed event prompted gossip with the PAP that this could signal the end of Goh's political career. While Lee Kuan Yew was worried that Goh may lack the political sensitivity of the ground, as he failed to detect the possible loss of the seat and remained overconfident until very close to Polling day, he did not blame Goh for the loss, as he reflects this incident in his memoir: From Third World to First. 

In 1985, Goh became Deputy Prime Minister and began to assume the responsibility of the government in a carefully managed leadership transition. According to Lee Kuan Yew, his preferred successor was Tony Tan. However, Goh was selected by the second generation of PAP leaders that included Tony Tan and Ong Teng Cheong; Lee accepted their decision. However, during the 1988 National Day Rally, Lee Kuan Yew publicly discussed his preferred choice of successor to the nation - ranking Goh as number 2 below Tony Tan, and while praising his 'faster mind', criticized his indecisiveness and softer and consultative approach to leadership. This led to Goh feeling humiliated and flabbergasted, as he reflects on this incident in his memoirs, Tall Order: The Goh Chok Tong Story.

Prime Minister 
On 28 November 1990, Goh succeeded Lee Kuan Yew and became the second Prime Minister of Singapore. During the first year of Goh's premiership, Lee remained as secretary-general of the PAP. Lee also remained an influential member of Goh's Cabinet, holding the post of Senior Minister. The 1991 general elections, the first electoral test for Goh, led to the party winning 61% of the popular vote which is the all-time low for PAP since independence. Because of the drop in share of the popular vote, and losing an unprecedented four seats in Parliament to the opposition, Goh has to quell rumours about his potential resignation to the international news media. In 1992, Lee handed over the post of Secretary-General of the People's Action Party (PAP) to Goh, successfully completing the leadership transition.

Goh's Deputy Prime Ministers: Lee Hsien Loong and Ong Teng Cheong was both diagnosed with cancer in 1992, which prompted the prime minister to call an by-election in his own constituency of Marine Parade in 1992, just over 1 year after the 1991 General Elections, citing the need for 'political self-renewal' and to get 'ministerial calibre' people to join the government. Teo Chee Hean, who is currently one of the core leaders of the 3G members of PAP and Senior Minister, was one of the new politicians brought in to contest in the by-election.

As Prime Minister, Goh promised a more open-minded and consultative style of leadership than that of his predecessor. This greater openness extended also to the socio-economic spheres of life, for instance, in his support for the rise of "little bohemias" in Singapore, enclaves where more creativity and entrepreneurship could thrive.

Goh's administration introduced several major policies and policy institutions, including:

 Medisave
 Non-Constituency Members of Parliament
 Government Parliamentary Committees
 Group Representation Constituency
 Nominated Members of Parliament
 Vehicle Quota Scheme
 Elected President
 Singapore 21

During the period under Goh's administration, Singapore experienced several crises, such as the 1997 Asian financial crisis, threats of terrorism including the 2001 Singapore embassies attack plot by Jemaah Islamiyah, the 2001–2003 economic recession, and the 2003 SARS outbreak.

Goh's administration whose access to Bill Clinton's White House was blocked because of the Michael Fay incident did not deter Goh from reaching out to the US President to pitch his idea for a free trade agreement (FTA) between Singapore and the US, as he did not believe Clinton to be aware of the diplomatic freeze. With the help of American businessman Joe Ford, Goh managed to reached out to President Clinton during the 1997 APEC summit, where he played Golf with the President, ending the diplomatic freeze. On September 1998, Goh had a meeting with President Clinton in the White House and agreed to contribute to the Korean Peninsula Energy Development Organization (KEDO) which helped build strong ties between the two countries. The considerable improvement in this bilateral relationship had great impact on Singapore's economic recovery from the Asian Financial Crisis as several trade negotiations, part of "The Millennium Round" have failed (1999 Seattle WTO protests and Doha Round) have broken down. As international trade was three times Singapore's GDP at that time, securing trade treaties was paramount to Singapore's economic survival, with the US as its most desired trading partner. By riding on the improved relationship with the Clinton's administration, Goh personally reached out to President Clinton during the annual summit at Brunei in November 2000, near the end of Clinton's second term of his presidency. After a midnight golf session with Clinton after the banquet, Goh successfully convinced Clinton on a Singapore-USA FTA, with Clinton suggesting a FTA similar to the US-Jordan FTA. The FTA with USA was eventually signed in 2003 and this was USA first FTA with an Asian country, with Goh exalting this FTA as the "crown jewel" of Singapore's international trade.

Under Goh's leadership, Singapore also signed an FTA with Japan in 2002, with Japan deepening her trade ties with ASEAN with a FTA with ASEAN in 2008.

As Secretary-General, Goh led the PAP to three general election victories in 1991, 1997, and 2001, in which the party won 61%, 65% and 75% of the votes respectively. After the 2001 general election, Goh indicated that he would step down as Prime Minister after leading the country out of the recession.

During an interview with Time magazine in July 2003, Goh surprised Singaporeans by announcing that his government was openly employing homosexuals, even in sensitive jobs, despite homosexual acts remaining illegal under Section 377A of the Penal Code. Although his announcement drew a strong backlash from conservatives, it nevertheless reinforced his image as an open-minded leader.

Senior Minister 

On 12 August 2004, Goh stepped down as Prime Minister and held a new position as Senior Minister in the Cabinet of his successor, Lee Hsien Loong. On 20 August 2004, Goh assumed the position of Chairman of the Monetary Authority of Singapore. After a number of threats of terrorism in Singapore, Goh met local Islamic religious leaders in 2004 and made a visit to Iran, where he met Iranian president Mohammad Khatami and visited local mosques.

Goh subsequently visited other Middle Eastern countries as Senior Minister, with a view to improving diplomatic relationships and thus gaining wider opportunities for Singaporean businesses, especially in the United Arab Emirates, Qatar and Kuwait.

On 1 February 2005, Goh was appointed an honorary Companion of the Order of Australia, Australia's highest civilian honour, "for eminent service to Australia-Singapore relations".

On 19 May 2005, Goh signed a Double Taxation Avoidance Agreement with Israel's Finance Minister Benjamin Netanyahu on a visit to Israel, superseding the agreement signed in 1971. Improvements in the agreement include enhancements to the withholding tax rate on interest income, which was reduced from 15% to 7%. This would benefit Singaporean businessmen with investments in Israel and vice versa, by ensuring they are not taxed twice.

Goh is a patron for the Institute of Policy Studies, a government think tank.

In the 2006 general election, Goh was tasked to help the PAP win back the two opposition wards of Hougang and Potong Pasir. However, he was unsuccessful in this task, as Low Thia Khiang and Chiam See Tong retained their respective wards.

In 2006, Goh was briefly considered for the job of United Nations Secretary-General but he lost out and the job eventually went to Ban Ki-moon.

In 2008, Goh was invited to join the InterAction Council of Former Heads of State and Government, an independent international organisation of former world leaders.

On 24 January 2011, Goh announced that he would continue to seek re-election to Parliament at the 2011 general election. Over the following months, he progressively released snippets prior to the election on the importance of grooming a successor who could be part of the fourth generation PAP leadership to helm Marine Parade GRC in the long run.

Emeritus Senior Minister 
After the 2011 general election in which the opposition made unprecedented gains by winning a group representative constituency in (Aljunied), Goh and Lee Kuan Yew announced that they were retiring from the Cabinet in order to give Prime Minister Lee Hsien Loong and the rest of his team a clean slate from which they can make a fresh start in the new parliamentary term.

On 18 May 2011, Lee Hsien Loong announced that Goh was to be appointed a senior adviser to the Monetary Authority of Singapore, and would be given the honorary title of "Emeritus Senior Minister".

On 24 June 2011, Goh was awarded the Grand Cordon of the Order of the Rising Sun by the Japanese government.

On 4 May 2012, Goh was appointed as Patron for Advancement of the Singapore University of Technology and Design.

In October 2014, the Madame Tussauds Singapore museum unveiled a wax figure of Goh. At its opening, Goh posed for pictures with his statue.

On 2 August 2018, Goh stated that ministerial pay is not enough and it will adversely impact the ability to attract competent people to join the government in the future. He also dismissed the idea of reducing the minister's salary as a populist move, a move that sparked controversy and public disapproval.

In 2018, Goh's first volume authorised biography book titled Tall Order: The Goh Chok Tong Story was published. It details Goh's life from his childhood to until he took office as Singapore's second prime minister in 1990.

In an interview in 2019, Goh stated that he believed a 75% to 80% majority in Parliament, in the future, would constitute a 'strong mandate' for the Singapore government. In the same interview, he noted that he does not believe the electoral system needed any further tweaking.

On 4 August 2019, Goh made a Facebook post stating that he felt saddened by how his long-time friend, former PAP politician Tan Cheng Bock, had "lost his way" by forming a new political party, Progress Singapore Party (PSP), to contest in the next general election.

On 25 June 2020, Goh made a Facebook post announcing his retirement as a Member of Parliament for Marine Parade GRC after 44 years of service and will therefore retire from politics.

In December 2020, Goh stated in his Facebook post that he will be undergoing four weeks of radiotherapy following the removal of a lump in his larynx in order to ensure that all cancer cells are eliminated. It was the latest in a series of health scares faced by Mr Goh in recent years.

A second volume of his biography titled Standing Tall: The Goh Chok Tong Years was released in April 2021 to mark his 80th birthday. The sequel consists of the 14 years which Goh was the Prime Minister of Singapore.

Honours
:
 Knight Grand Commander of the Order of the Crown of Johor (11 May 1991)
:
 Honorary Companion of the Order of Australia (1 February 2005) 
:
 Grand Cordon of the Order of the Rising Sun (24 June 2011)

Family 
Goh is married to Tan Choo Leng and they have a son and a daughter, who are twins. Their son, Goh Jin Hian, is a physician and their daughter, Goh Jin Theng, lives in London with her husband.

Legacy
The Goh Chok Tong Enable Awards by Mediacorp Enable Fund is named after him.

References

Bibliography
 Impressions of the Goh Chok Tong Years in Singapore by Bridget Welsh, James Chin, Arun Mahizhnan and Tan Tarn How (Editors), Singapore: NUS Press, 2009.
 Brand Singapore: How Nation Branding Built Asia's Leading Global City by Koh, Buck Song. Marshall Cavendish, Singapore, 2011. .
 Article on civil society in the Goh Chok Tong era – "What plants will grow under the tembusu tree?" by Koh Buck Song, The Straits Times 9 May 1998.
 Tall Order by Shing Huei Peh, Singapore: World Scientific, 2018.

External links

|-

|-

|-

Prime Ministers of Singapore
Members of the Cabinet of Singapore
Members of the Parliament of Singapore
Chairmen of the Monetary Authority of Singapore
People's Action Party politicians
Honorary Companions of the Order of Australia
Grand Cordons of the Order of the Rising Sun
University of Singapore alumni
Raffles Institution alumni
Singaporean agnostics
Singaporean people of Hokkien descent
Singaporean politicians of Chinese descent
Williams College alumni
1941 births
Living people
Ministers for Defence of Singapore
Ministers for Trade and Industry of Singapore